Frank Coppola may refer to:
Frank J. Coppola (1944–1982), American police officer who was executed for murder
Francis Ford Coppola (born 1939), American film director
Frank Coppola (mobster) (1899–1982), Italian-American mobster and crime boss